The George Washington Hotel in Washington, Pennsylvania was designed by renowned architect William Lee Stoddart and built in 1923. Since then, it has been graced by Presidents John F. Kennedy and Harry S. Truman, film star Joan Blondell, big band leader Harry James, among many persons of distinction. The hotel is also home to the largest remaining mural of early American artist, Malcolm Parcell.

Well known Washington, PA artist Malcolm Parcell created 6 murals for the Pioneer room. The Conestoga Wagon, Pony Express, Pack Horse, Stage Coach, Lafayette visits Washington, and Bradford's Escape. Parcell lived Prosperity, PA in a small white house he called Moon Lorn.

After the closing of the Hays Hall dormitory at Washington & Jefferson College, the George Washington Hotel served as a residence hall from 1968 to 1971. The College rented the entire 5th and 6th floors. These two floors contained 25 rooms each, which was enough for the 86 former residents of Hayes Hall, the House Mother, and four floor proctors.

References

External links

William Lee Stoddart buildings
Buildings and structures in Washington County, Pennsylvania
Hotels in Pennsylvania
Washington, Pennsylvania
Hotels established in 1923
Hotel buildings completed in 1923
1923 establishments in Pennsylvania